Midnight Song can refer to:

 Song at Midnight, a 1937 Chinese film
 Midnight Songs poetry
 Midnight Song, another name for  Friedrich Nietzsche's Zarathustra's roundelay

See also 

 Midnight (disambiguation)
 The Midnights
 The Midnight